There have been several hereditary and life peerages created for persons with the surname Morris, all in the Peerage of the United Kingdom.

Baron Morris, of St John’s in the Dominion of Newfoundland and of the City of Waterford, is a title in the Peerage of the United Kingdom. It was created in 1918 for the lawyer and politician Sir Edward Morris upon his retirement as Prime Minister of Newfoundland.  the title is held by his great-grandson, the fourth Baron, who succeeded his father in 2011.

Barons Morris (1918)
Edward Patrick Morris, 1st Baron Morris (1858–1935)
Michael William Morris, 2nd Baron Morris (1903–1975)
Michael David Morris, 3rd Baron Morris (1937–2011)
Thomas Anthony Salmon Morris, 4th Baron Morris (b. 1982)

The heir presumptive is the present holder's brother, the Hon. James Morris (b. 1983)

Line of Succession

  Edward Patrick Morris, 1st Baron Morris (1858 – 1935)
  Michael William Morris, 2nd Baron Morris (1903 – 1975)
  Michael David Morris, 3rd Baron Morris (1937 – 2011)
  Thomas Anthony Salmon Morris, 4th Baron Morris (born 1982)
 (1) Hon. James Morris (b. 1983)
 (2) Hon. Edward Patrick Morris (b. 1937)
 (3) Edward Patrick Morris (b. 1965)

Barons Morris of Kenwood (1950)
see the Baron Morris of Kenwood

Law life peerages

Baron Morris (1889)
Michael Morris, 1st Baron Killanin (1826–1901), see the Baron Killanin

Baron Morris of Borth-y-Gest (1960)
John William Morris, Baron Morris of Borth-y-Gest (1896–1979)

Life peerages

The following people have life peerages with variants of Baron/Baroness Morris:

Charles Morris, Baron Morris of Grasmere (1898–1990)
Brian Morris, Baron Morris of Castle Morris (1930–2001)
Alf Morris, Baron Morris of Manchester (1928–2012)
John Morris, Baron Morris of Aberavon (b. 1931)
Patricia Morris, Baroness Morris of Bolton  (b. 1954)
Estelle Morris, Baroness Morris of Yardley (b. 1952)
Bill Morris, Baron Morris of Handsworth (b. 1938)

See also
Michael Morris, Baron Naseby
William Morris, 1st Viscount Nuffield

Notes

References 

Kidd, Charles, Williamson, David (editors). Debrett's Peerage and Baronetage (1990 edition). New York: St Martin's Press, 1990, 

Baronies in the Peerage of the United Kingdom
Noble titles created in 1918
Noble titles created in 1889
Noble titles created for UK MPs